Samyukta Maharashtra Movement, commonly known as the Samiti, was an organisation in India that advocated for a separate Marathi-speaking state in Western India and Central India from 1956 to 1960.

The Samiti demanded the creation of a new state from Marathi-speaking areas of the State of Bombay, a Marathi state, with the city of Bombay as its capital. The Samiti achieved its goal when the state of Maharashtra was created as a Marathi linguistic state on 1 May 1960. Members continued to advocate for the inclusion of Marathi-speaking areas in northern Karnataka such as Belgaum, Karwar, Dharwad and Bidar into Maharashtra, and the newly annexed state of Goa and Damaon until the 1967 Goa Opinion Poll rejected merger with Maharashtra.

History
The Samyukta Maharashtra Movement organisation was founded on 6 February 1956, at Tilak Smarak Mandir in Pune. The Samiti declared its Executive Council. Shripad Amrit Dange as the President. Dr. T. R.Naravane as Vice President and S. M. Joshi as General Secretary were selected.  Many of the Prominent activists of Samyukta Maharashtra Samiti were leftists such as Shreedhar Mahadev Joshi, Shripad Amrit Dange,  Narayan Ganesh Gore, and Uddhavrao Patil. Other leaders included Anna Bhau Sathe,     Maina Gawankar, Walchand Kothari, Pralhad Keshav Atre, Keshav Sitaram Thackeray, Pandurang Mahadev Bapat, Bhausaheb Raut,  and Amar Shaikh, G. T. Madkholkar, Madhu Dandavate, Y. K. Souni. As a part of the campaign, Pralhad Keshav Atre used his  Maratha newspaper to criticise Prime minister Jawaharlal Nehru, Morarji Desai (then chief minister of Bombay state) and  S.K. Patil, the Mumbai Congress party politician who favored  separation of Mumbai city from a linguistically reconstituted Maharashtra or Gujarat.

The Indian National Congress had pledged to introduce linguistic states prior to Independence. However, after Independence, Jawaharlal Nehru and Sardar Vallabhbhai Patel were adamantly opposed to linguistic states. They perceived linguistic states as a threat to the integrity of India. For the first time and perhaps the only time, Rashtriya Swayamsevak Sangh  and its chief Madhav Sadashiv Golwalkar supported Nehru and Patel against redrawing of the map along linguistic lines. The catalyst to the creation of a States Re-organization Commission was the fasting death of Telugu nationalist Potti Sriramulu. In 1956, the SRC (States Re-organisation Committee) recommended creation of linguistic states of Andhra Pradesh, Kerala and Karnataka but recommended a bi-lingual state for Maharashtra-Gujarat, with Bombay as its capital but Vidarbha outside Maharashtra. Further, they recommended the creation of Vidharba state to unite the Marathi-speaking people of former Hyderabad state with Marathi-speaking areas of Central Provinces and Berar state. On 21 November 1955, demonstrators were fired upon by the police at Flora Fountain in the capital city of Bombay. Flora Fountain was subsequently renamed Hutatma Chowk or "Martyr's Crossroad" in their memory. It is estimated that in a total of 106 people were shot by security forces during the period of agitation and at different places. Morarji Desai, who was the then chief minister of Bombay State was later removed and replaced by Yashwantrao Chavan as a result of criticism related to the 21 November incident. Nehru's speech dissenting with the SRC led C. D. Deshmukh, the then Finance Minister of the Nehru Cabinet to resign his post in January 1956. This led to the creation of the predecessor movement Sanyukta Maharashtra Parishad, inaugurated on 1 November 1956, causing a great political stir and, under the leadership of Keshavrao Jedhe, a whole party meeting was held in Pune and Samyukta Maharashtra Samiti was founded on 6 February 1956. In the second general election of 1957, the Samiti defeated the stalwarts of Congress by securing 101 seats out of 133, including 12 from Bombay. The Congress party could form a government only with the support of Gujarat, Marathwada and Vidharba.

The Samyukta Maharashtra Samiti achieved its goal on 1 May 1960, when the State of Bombay was partitioned into the Marathi-speaking State of Maharashtra and the Gujarati-speaking State of Gujarat. However Goa (then a Portuguese colony), Belgaum, Karwar and adjoining areas, which were also part of the Maharashtra envisaged by the Samiti, were not included in Maharashtra state. Prominent leaders of the Samyukta Maharashtra Samiti  decided to quit the organization after 1 May 1960, but the then chairman of the Samiti, Bhai Uddhavrao Patil, continued his fight for the 862 Marathi-speaking villages of Karnataka that were excluded in 1960.

See also

 Mahagujarat Movement
 Hutatma Chowk
 States Reorganisation Act
 Chronology of statehood of Maharashtra

References

External links
 Samyukta Maharashtra movement
 Founding of the Samiti
 'Zalach Pahije!' by P.K. Atre 

History of Maharashtra (1947–present)
Reorganisation of Indian states
1956 in India
Protests in India